Lumbardha Misini (born 2 April 2003) is a Kosovan footballer who plays as a defender for Women's League club KFF Vizioni and the Kosovo women's national team.

See also
List of Kosovo women's international footballers

References

2003 births
Living people
Kosovan women's footballers
Women's association football defenders
Kosovo women's international footballers